Pleasant Hall is a historic home located in Kempsville section of Virginia Beach, Virginia.  Built in 1769, it is a two-story, five bay, double pile Georgian style brick dwelling.  It is topped by a shallow gable roof and has two wide interior-end chimney stacks with corbeled caps.

It was added to the National Register of Historic Places in 1973.

References

External links

Houses on the National Register of Historic Places in Virginia
Georgian architecture in Virginia
Houses completed in 1779
Houses in Virginia Beach, Virginia
National Register of Historic Places in Virginia Beach, Virginia
Historic American Buildings Survey in Virginia